Elizabeth "Liz" Allan, also known as Elizabeth Allan-Osborn and commonly misspelled as "Liz Allen", is a fictional character appearing in American comic books published by Marvel Comics. The character was created by Stan Lee and Steve Ditko. In the character's earliest appearances, she was a popular girl at the high school Peter Parker attends. She has been a regular supporting character in the various Spider-Man, Daredevil, and Venom series in an on-and-off basis, and has ties to the Green Goblin and Molten Man. She is the wife of Harry Osborn, the mother of their son Normie Osborn, and the CEO of Alchemax. In the non-canonical Ultimate Marvel continuity, Liz is depicted as Firestar.

Sally Livingstone portrays Liz Allan in Sam Raimi's Spider-Man (2002), while Laura Harrier portrayed Liz Allan in the Marvel Cinematic Universe (MCU) films Spider-Man: Homecoming (2017) and Spider-Man: No Way Home (2021). This version of the character is the daughter of the Vulture.

Publication history
Liz Allan is named in The Amazing Spider-Man #4 (September 1963), the same issue in which Betty Brant first appears. However, an unnamed blonde female high school student in Amazing Fantasy #15 (August 1962) appears to be Liz Allan, and The Marvel Encyclopedia lists this as her official first appearance. She was a supporting character in the series until Amazing Spider-Man #28 (September 1965), which bids farewell to Liz as both she and Spider-Man graduate from high school.

Nearly a decade later, Liz Allan was brought back in a story arc in Amazing Spider-Man #132-133 (May–June 1974), in which it is revealed that she is the Molten Man's stepsister. Writer Gerry Conway recalled, "I liked doing callbacks to the run I was most influenced by, the original Stan Lee/Steve Ditko era, so bringing Liz back was something I'd wanted to do for a long time. And it gave me a reason to go back and look through the issues she was in, which brought me to the Molten Man's first appearance."

Fictional character biography
Liz Allan was a high school student that attended Midtown High School together, and a minor love interest of Peter Parker and Flash Thompson.

Peter likes Liz but, she is Flash's girlfriend and considers Peter something of a loser, even taking part in the general ridicule that Peter endures on a daily basis. Her earliest appearances depict her as flighty and rather thoughtless - not outright cruel, but lacking the empathy necessary to perceive Peter's nature.

However, after she hears an ailing Peter had donned a Spider-Man costume in order to save Betty Brant from Doctor Octopus, she develops a crush on him. By this time, however, Peter's interest has waned considerably, as he notes that Liz never showed any real interest in him until he began dating Betty Brant, and assumes that Liz's feelings are little more than a schoolgirl crush. Betty and Liz clash several times over Peter, as Betty mistakenly thinks that Peter reciprocates Liz's interest in him.

In Amazing Spider-Man #28 (September 1965), Peter and Liz graduate from high school. At the graduation ceremony, Liz admits her feelings to Peter, and says she accepts the fact that her feelings are unrequited. In the same issue, Spider-Man battles the Molten Man, who in later issues is revealed to be Liz's stepbrother, Mark Raxton.

She does not appear for a few years, during which time Peter developed relationships with Gwen Stacy and Mary Jane Watson. When Liz returns, she dates then marries Harry Osborn, whom she meets at Betty Brant's wedding to Ned Leeds, becoming Liz Allan Osborn. The couple have a son, Normie Osborn. Their family history turns tragic, however, after Harry Osborn has a mental breakdown. In the guise of the Green Goblin, Harry kidnaps Liz, Normie, and Mark, and terrorizes them within an old family mansion. Liz is deeply traumatized by this experience, and falls into a state of denial about her husband's problems. Harry's madness leads to his death shortly after. Struggling to put Harry behind her, Liz breaks ties with Peter and Mary Jane.

In the graphic novel, Spider-Man: Legacy of Evil, Harry attempts to pass the legacy of the Green Goblin down to Normie Osborn but fails due to the efforts of Spider-Man, Mark Raxton, and Ben Urich.

Later, Liz Allan became a supporting character in Daredevil, serving as a love interest for lawyer Foggy Nelson. The couple breaks up after Mysterio manipulates Foggy into having an affair in a plot to drive Daredevil insane. Liz feels like Foggy has let her down and ends their relationship.

After Spider-Man publicly reveals his real identity in the "Civil War" storyline, Liz becomes resentful of him, blaming Peter for bringing so much death into their lives. However, after the events of the "One More Day" storyline, the public revelation of Peter's identity has been forgotten and Harry is seemingly still alive but he and Liz are no longer married.

Liz and Normie are present when the Molten Man is given the antidote to his condition. Raxton, who had escaped the basement in which Liz was keeping him for his own safety, is cured thanks to Oscorp. Liz is last seen attending a party to help Flash Thompson deal with the loss of his legs.

During the 2011 "Fear Itself" storyline, Liz is seen trying to leave New York with her son, due to the fear and chaos that is happening, and encounters bank robbers.

Recently, she has been shown in a new alliance with Norman Osborn as he attempts to re-establish himself as a corporate figure - apparently using an alias as his activities as the Green Goblin have made his true name too public, working with him to ensure her son's future. Following a confrontation between Spider-Man 2099 and an agent of a time-travel organization from 2211 in the Alchemax Building, Liz has deduced that the 'new' Spider-Man must work in the company and is determined to enlist him to her cause, foreshadowing the time-traveler's claims that Liz Allan and Spider-Man 2099 will have some significant impact on future history.

Liz then appears as the CEO of Alchemax when Eddie Brock enters her office and brings her an experimental dinosaur he captured. She reveals that Stegron the Dinosaur Man is responsible and makes a deal with Eddie: she will help him find a cure for the Venom symbiote while he deals with Stegron.

Other versions

Amazing Spider-Man: Renew Your Vows
In Amazing Spider-Man: Renew Your Vows, carried on from the Secret Wars storyline, Liz divorced Harry sometime before his death and is in charge of Allan Biotech. As her son, Normie, is too busy running Oscorp, she has Normie's personal assistant Miss January report to her on Normie's activities. Worried that Normie will end up like his father or grandfather, Allan tries to get rid of Spider-Man by tricking his wife Spinneret (Mary Jane) into wearing the Venom symbiote, claiming it was an organic biotech suit meant to unleash a human's hidden potential so Spinneret wouldn't rely on Regent's tech to drain her husband's powers to fight. However, Miss January ends up pushing Normie to become the Green Goblin like his father and grandfather behind Liz's back so she could take the Goblin Mech and avenge Harry by killing Spider-Man. After Miss January's defeat, Liz is reunited with Normie and vows to be there for him more.

MC2
In the MC2 continuity, Liz Allan married Foggy Nelson after the death of Harry Osborn. She developed a fatal illness (of a non-specified nature), which contributed to her son Normie's breakdown and finally choosing to adopt the mantle of the Green Goblin.

Spider-Man Loves Mary Jane
In Spider-Man Loves Mary Jane, Liz Allan is portrayed as Mary Jane Watson's ditzy and feisty best friend. Liz is a cheerleader and has recently reconciled with her boyfriend Flash Thompson after breaking up with him because he declared that he loved Mary Jane at homecoming.

Ultimate Marvel

The Ultimate Marvel version of Liz Allan goes to the same high school with Spider-Man and Mary Jane Watson. She is close friends with Mary Jane. In Ultimate Spider-Man #4 (February 2001), a drunk Liz attempts to make out with Peter, who refuses her advances when Mary Jane sees them. They later have a very personal moment when both students are called to talk about the Green Goblin's attack on the school, which affected her greatly. Otherwise, there is no instance of any relationship between Peter and Liz. Liz claims to have had an uncle who was a mutant, who died, though she never explained what exactly happened. As a result of this, Liz has a phobia of mutants (in particular) and super-powered beings (in general), and it has been suggested by other characters that she worries that she herself is a mutant. When Johnny Storm joined her school briefly, she became extremely attracted to him and they shared a happy date - until he accidentally lit himself on fire, revealing himself as the Human Torch. Mary Jane reveals to Johnny that Liz believes she lit him on fire. Due to her phobia, she refused to see him ever again, and he leaves the school.

With the arrival of  Kitty Pryde, a publicly known mutant and former X-Man, at Midtown High, Liz has been complaining to anyone that will listen that Kitty should be with her "own kind" and even accused Kitty of thinking she was better than everyone else due to her being a former X-Man, at which point Kitty rebutted Liz's accusations. Liz's best friend, Mary Jane, has also told Liz to keep her mutant phobia to herself when she's around MJ, and that she'd prefer it if Liz kept those thoughts to herself in general.

It is subsequently revealed that Liz is a mutant herself, and the Ultimate version of Firestar. Her powers manifest which are witnessed by her friends during a beach party. At first, she accuses her date, Johnny Storm (the Human Torch), of making her super-powered. After a talk with the X-Men's Iceman and Spider-Man, and upon recalling that her 'uncle' was a mutant, she accepts that she may be a mutant herself.

Magneto appears after detecting the manifestation of her powers and reveals that years ago, her father asked Magneto to reach out to her after the manifestation of her mutant powers. Magneto promised to him, whether Liz is a mutant or not, he will tell Liz of what her father sacrificed. Magneto revealed to Liz that her father is a mutant and one of the Brotherhood of Mutants.

Magneto, intending to keep his promise of reaching Liz, is delayed by the combined efforts of Iceman and Spider-Man. However, they are no match for Magneto, though they are able to buy Liz the time she needs to get away. Liz returns home, and demands her mother tell her the identity of her father. Her mother reveals that her Uncle Frank, otherwise known as the Blob is actually her father. This conversation is interrupted by Magneto, who tells Liz that she must go with him to see her father. This is prevented when the X-Men arrive at her doorstep. Liz is pressured to decide between the Brotherhood or the X-Men. After asking Spider-Man's advice, she decides she doesn't want to follow either group, and that she is angry at her mother for lying to her for all these years, and flies away. Spider-Man figures out that she's going to Mary Jane's house, and follows.

After Liz arrives at Mary Jane's home, MJ suggests that she should talk to Kitty Pryde about being a mutant. Spider-Man arrives, and in order to gain Liz's trust, unmasks himself revealing that he is Peter Parker, one of her friends. Inspired by Peter's examples, Liz sees that she does not have to be defined by her paternity and chooses to use her powers responsibly. Liz promises not to tell his secret just as Iceman arrives, offering Liz a place at Xavier's School so she may learn to control her newfound powers. Liz, unwilling to return to her mother's house, decides to be with the X-Men until she can figure out what to do next. She promises to call Peter and MJ soon.

In Ultimate X-Men #94 it is shown that Liz has taken the codename Firestar and is now seemingly getting along with the X-Men and has better control of her powers. In the Ultimate X-Men/Fantastic Four Annual, she is revealed to be the "Human Torch member" of the future Fantastic Four team. The modern version helps the X-Men and FF battle various threats raised by the future team.

Liz appears in Ultimate Comics: X where she is a part of the Tomorrow People (Runaways), a government-funded mutant team with Jimmy Hudson, "Karen Grant", Derek Morgan aka the Guardian, and the Hulk. After briefly working with the team, she settles in Tian, a safe haven for mutants, until its destruction and then rejoins the X-Men.

In other media

Television

 Liz Allan appears in the 1994 Spider-Man series, voiced by Marla Rubinoff. This version is a friend and confidant of Mary Jane Watson who is attracted to Harry Osborn, even after he becomes the second Green Goblin. Eventually, Liz attends Peter Parker and Mary Jane's wedding, which Harry attacks in an attempt to force Mary Jane to marry him instead. However, Liz appeals to Harry and admits her love for him, causing him to relent and willingly return to the hospital where he had been receiving psychiatric treatment.
 Liz Allan appears in The Spectacular Spider-Man, voiced by Alanna Ubach. This version is of Hispanic descent. She is friends with Sally Avril and, at the beginning of the series, dating Flash Thompson, but shows interest in Peter Parker after he begins tutoring her. She also starts to express regret after Flash and the popular clique reject Peter. After spending time with Peter at Coney Island in the episode "Reaction", she breaks up with Flash and becomes openly complimentary towards Peter. In the episode "Shear Strength", she reveals her feelings to Peter and kisses him. In the following episode, Peter and Liz begin dating, but his activities as Spider-Man and feelings for Gwen Stacy complicate their relationship. In "Final Curtain", he breaks up with Liz to be with Gwen, leaving her angry and heartbroken, though to save face in front of her peers, she makes it appear as if it was the other way around.
 Liz Allan appears in the 2017 Spider-Man series, voiced by Natalie Lander. This version is a student and class president at Midtown High School. In the episode "Screwball Live", she takes the alias of Screwball to pull pranks on corrupt businessmen and posts her actions online. However, she draws the attention of Spider-Man, Hammerhead, and Absorbing Man, though the hero is able to defeat the villains. Following this, Liz puts Screwball on "hiatus". In the five-part episode "Spider Island", Liz is mutated into a Man Spider before she is eventually cured by the Ultimate Spider-Man.

Film
 Liz Allan appears in the original script for Cannon's aborted Spider-Man film, written by Ted Newsom and John Brancato, as Peter Parker's love interest.
 According to the tie-in novelization for the 2002 live-action Spider-Man film, Liz Allan appears in a short scene, portrayed by Sally Livingstone. At the beginning of the film, Peter attempts to share a seat on a bus with a girl with thick glasses, Liz, but she rebuffs him.
 Liz Allan appears in the Marvel Cinematic Universe (MCU) film Spider-Man: Homecoming (2017), portrayed by Laura Harrier. This version is a senior at Midtown Science High School, the daughter of criminal Adrian Toomes, and leader of the decathlon team who Peter Parker has a crush on. Over the course of the film, she becomes a fan of and develops a crush on Spider-Man before developing a romantic interest in Peter, but remains unaware that they are the same person. After Toomes is arrested, Liz and her mother move to Oregon on his wishes.
 Liz Allan makes a cameo appearance in the MCU film Spider-Man: No Way Home (2021), with Harrier reprising her role. After Peter's identity is publicly exposed, she becomes the subject of several magazine articles where she discusses her past relationship with him, confirming her surname to be "Allan". Liz also appears in the post-credits scene of the film's 2022 extended cut (via archive footage from Spider-Man: Homecoming), depicting the consequences of Doctor Strange's second spell.

Video games
 The Ultimate Marvel incarnation of Liz Allan appears in the 2005 Ultimate Spider-Man video game.
 Liz Allan appears in Marvel's Avengers, voiced by Elizabeth Grullon.

References

External links

 Liz Osborn at Marvel.com
 Liz Allan at Spiderfan.org
 Elizabeth Allan at Marvel Wiki

Characters created by Stan Lee
Characters created by Steve Ditko
Comics characters introduced in 1962
Fictional characters from Queens, New York
Fictional cheerleaders
Marvel Comics female characters
Marvel Comics film characters
Marvel Comics female superheroes
Teenage characters in comics
Spider-Man characters